Litoral Gas is the primary provider of natural gas to the city of Rosario, Santa Fe, in Argentina. Their role in the 2013 Rosario gas explosion is currently under investigation.

Litoral Gas was established on December 28, 1992, after the privatization of Gas del Estado. It distributes gas in all the Santa Fe Province, and the northwest of the Buenos Aires Province, at the partidos San Nicolás, Ramallo, Pergamino, Colón, Bartolomé Mitre, San Pedro and Baradero. It serves 661,081 customers and has a license of 35 years, which may be extended to another 10.

The company is controlled by Tibsa Inversora S.A., which is in turn controlled by Suez-Tractebel and by Techint. Suez-Trabeltec is the Argentine branch of the French GDF Suez.

References

External links

 Official site 

Oil and gas companies of Argentina
Companies based in Rosario, Santa Fe
Engie
1992 establishments in Argentina